The Muse clan is a Somali clan. Group members live in Somalia, Somaliland,  Ethiopia, Djibouti, and Yemen.

History
Muse was the father of the clan. He was an early follower of the prophet Mohammed. According to his progeny, Shaykh Muse arrived at the coastal land of Somaliland, Mitte, or Maydh. He came from Hadramaut, Yemen. It is believed that his grave is close to Sheikh Isaaq's tomb in Maydh.

It is believed that his biography was lost after his history had been disregarded. Today Shaykh Muse is reputed to be the ancestor of the clan named after him and who venerate him once every year. Sheikh Muse is among the Shaykhs who are venerated in Somaliland and Somalia, and professional shoemaker, haircut, and metalsmith groups also venerate him.

Notable people

1. Suldan Abdi Ismail

2. Suldan Mohammed Suldan Abdi Ismail

3. Sacid Mohammed Mohammud senator for Federal Parliament of Somalia

4. Hussein Ibrahim Buni vice Minister for the planning of Somaliland

5. Mahdi Haji Osman vice Minister for the health of  Somaliland

6. Ali Hussein (Ali Makadshe)

 MUSE (clan); Family Tree:
 1. Abokor Muse 
 2. Harun Muse 

 Cabdulle Haruun Muuse
 1.	Rooble
 A. Biniin
 B. Fahiye
 C. Sharmarke

 2.	Aden
 A. Diriye
 B. Farrax

 3.	Caamir Abdulle
 A. Sayre Caamir
 B. Ismacil Camir

 4.	Abiib Abdulle
 A. Xagga Abiib
 B. Yusuf Abiib

 5.	Bashane Abdulle
 
 A.	Qabile Bashan
 B.	Qadiid Bashan

 Xoosh (Talaabacae) Haaruun -Muuse
 1.	Liiban Xoosh
 2.	Ceeleey Xoosh
 3.	Odowaa. Xoosh

 Iimaan Haaruun Muuse
 A. ----Imaan
 B. ----- Imaan

 Jibriil Abokor Muuse
 A. Cali Jibril
 B. Gambool Jibril
 C. Seed-Gaboobe JIbril

 Osman Abokor Muuse
 A. Alamagan Osman
 B. Amaadin Osman
 C. Shiil Osman

References

Somali clans
Somali clans in Ethiopia